Tywappity Township is an inactive township in Scott County, in the U.S. state of Missouri.

Tywappity Township was erected in 1822. "Tywappity" is a name possibly derived from the Shawnee language.

References

Townships in Missouri
Townships in Scott County, Missouri